Marcello Durazzo (Genoa, 1710 - Genoa, December 1791) was the 169th Doge of the Republic of Genoa.

Biography 
On February 3, 1767 Durazzo became Doge of Genoa. His Dogate was marked by the definitive loss of the island of Corsica to France, in the Treaty of Versailles. On February 3, 1769, he ended his Dogate and later became head of the war magistrate and state inquisitors. Then Durazzo became deputy for the works of the Port of Savona and had the fort of Vado built, always on a personal design, which was then called Forte Marcello in his honor. Until 1791 he had three positions: protector of the "Jewish nation", magistrate of the Worship and protector of the Holy Office. Durazzo died in Genoa in December 1791 at 81 years old.

See also 

 Republic of Genoa
 Doge of Genoa
 Durazzo family

References 

18th-century Doges of Genoa
1710 births
1791 deaths